Opinion polling has been commissioned throughout the duration of the 48th New Zealand Parliament and in the leadup to the 2008 election by various organisations, the main four being Television New Zealand, TV3, The New Zealand Herald and Roy Morgan Research. The sample size, margin of error and confidence interval of each poll varies by organisation and date.

Party vote and key events in the leadup to the 2008 election
Refusals are generally excluded from the party vote percentages, while question wording and the treatment of "don't know" responses and those not intending to vote may vary between survey firms.

Graphical summary

Individual polls

Preferred Prime Minister

Graphical summary

Individual polls

See also
Opinion polling for the 2005 New Zealand general election
Opinion polling for the 2011 New Zealand general election
Candidates in the 2008 New Zealand general election by electorate

Notes

References

2008 New Zealand general election
2008
New Zealand